Jean Pierre Mifsud Triganza (born 20 November 1981 in Msida, Malta) is a professional footballer who plays for Msida Saint-Joseph as a striker.

Playing career

Mifsud Triganza began his career with Floriana and was promoted to the first team during the 2000–01 season. He made two appearances early in the season, but did achieve a 50% strike rate, after scoring a goal in a 1–1 draw against Naxxar Lions.

Following two seasons on loan with Msida St. Joseph, Mifsud Triganza returned to Floriana, and started to establish himself as a first team regular, making 17 appearances and scoring four goals during the 2002–03 season, as Floriana narrowly avoided relegation, finishing 2nd in the relegation group, and thereby 8th in the overall league table. He began the 2003–04 season, hoping to force his way into a regular starting slot for Floriana. He made 12 appearances and scored three goals, but following some impressive performances he was signed by Birkirkara.

Msida Saint-Joseph
In spite of getting two games for Floriana early in 2000–01, it was clear Mifsud Triganza would need to be loaned out in order to gain first team experience. Mifsud Triganza spent the rest of the season on loan with Third Division club Msida Saint-Joseph, helping them to promotion. In just ten games, he managed to score 17 goals.

Mifsud Triganza was again loaned to Msida Saint-Joseph for the 2001–02 season. The season finished on a high for him as Msida Saint-Joseph won the Maltese Second Division title by eight clear points, with Mifsud Triganza scoring an impressive 24 goals to help the team's cause.

Birkirkara
Mifsud Triganza moved from Floriana to Birkirkara during the January transfer window of 2004. He went on to make nine appearances and scored four goals for Birkirkara during 2003–04 season, as his new side finished in 2nd place in the Maltese Premier League.

The 2004–05 season, was Mifsud Triganza's first full season with Birkirkara, Mifsud Triganza continued to show promise in front of goal, notching 12 goals in 21 appearances, as Birkirkara recorded their second consecutive 2nd-place finish in the Maltese Premier League and won the U*Bet FA Trophy.

The 2005–06 season, was the finest for Mifsud Triganza during his time with Birkirkara, Mifsud Triganza made 20 appearances and scored eight goals, as Birkirkara won the Maltese Premier League title, for the first time in six seasons.

Mifsud Triganza went into the 2006–07 season, hoping to emulate the success of the previous, however Birkirkara managed a third-place finish in the Maltese Premier League, with him again making 20 appearances, but scoring 11 goals.

For the 2007–08 season, Mifsud Triganza was again in the goals, scoring another 11 goal and making 25 appearances, as Birkirkara again finishing in third place in the Maltese Premier League. Despite the league finish, he was again a winner of the Maltese Cup.

Mifsud Triganza hoped to achieve a higher league position for the 2008–09 season, however Birkirkara again managed to finish in 3rd position for the third consecutive season, with Mifsud Triganza making 25 appearances and scoring eight goals. On 19 November 2008, he made his debut for Malta in the 0–1 defeat against Iceland.

Sliema Wanderers
In June 2009, he left Birkirkara and joined fellow Maltese Premier League team Sliema Wanderers. He made his Premier League debut for Sliema Wanderers on 30 August 2009 in a 1–0 defeat to Qormi.

Mifsud Triganza scored his first Premier League goal for Sliema Wanderers on 17 October 2009, and went on to score a hat trick in a 5–0 victory over Ħamrun Spartans. Birkirkara later on resigned Mifsud Triganza and assisted Demba Toure in a goal vs Hibernians FC.      Mifsud Triganza left Birkirkara for Rivals Valletta.

Honours
Msida Saint-Joseph
 2001–02 Maltese Second Division

Birkirkara
 2005–06 Maltese Premier League
 2005, 2008 Maltese Cup

Valletta
 2013–14 Maltese Premier League

Career statistics
Statistics accurate as of match played 1 August 2013.

References

External links
 Jean Pierre Mifsud Triganza at MaltaFootball.com
 

1981 births
Living people
People from Msida
Association football forwards
Maltese footballers
Malta international footballers
Floriana F.C. players
Msida Saint-Joseph F.C. players
Birkirkara F.C. players
Sliema Wanderers F.C. players
Valletta F.C. players
Balzan F.C. players
Ħamrun Spartans F.C. players
Mosta F.C. players
Pembroke Athleta F.C. players
Maltese Premier League players
Maltese Challenge League players